The 2021 Bad Homburg Open was a women's tennis tournament played on outdoor grass courts. It was the 1st edition of the Bad Homburg Open, and part of the WTA 250 series of the 2021 WTA Tour. The event took place at the TC Bad Homburg in Bad Homburg, Germany, from 20 until 26 June 2021.

Bad Homburg is historically significant in the development and popularity of tennis in Europe.

Champions

Singles 

  Angelique Kerber def.  Kateřina Siniaková, 6–3, 6–2.

Doubles 

  Darija Jurak /  Andreja Klepač def.  Nadiia Kichenok /  Raluca Olaru, 6–3, 6–1.

WTA singles main-draw entrants

Seeds

1 Rankings are as of June 14, 2021.

Other entrants
The following players received wildcards into the main draw:
  Victoria Azarenka
  Mona Barthel 
  Mara Guth

The following players received entry from the qualifying draw:
  Yuliya Hatouka
  Katarzyna Piter
  Ekaterina Yashina
  Anna Zaja

The following player received entry as a lucky loser:
  Riya Bhatia

Withdrawals
Before the tournament
  Irina-Camelia Begu → replaced by  Andrea Petkovic
  Jennifer Brady → replaced by  Varvara Gracheva
  Caroline Garcia → replaced by  Misaki Doi
  Barbora Krejčíková → replaced by  Tamara Korpatsch
  Maria Sakkari → replaced by  Clara Tauson
  Sloane Stephens → replaced by  Riya Bhatia
  Jil Teichmann → replaced by  Arantxa Rus
  Alison Van Uytvanck → replaced by  Martina Trevisan

During the tournament
  Victoria Azarenka (back injury)

WTA doubles main-draw entrants

Seeds

1 Rankings are as of June 14, 2021.

Other entrants
The following pairs received wildcards into the doubles main draw:
  Mara Guth /  Julia Middendorf

Withdrawals
  Amanda Anisimova /  Sloane Stephens (Stephens – right foot injury)

References

External links
 Official website

Bad Homburg Open
Bad Homburg Open
Bad Homburg Open
2021 in German tennis
Porsch